Ashley Gordon is a former professional Indigenous Australian rugby league footballer who played in the 1980s and 1990s as a er and  for the Newcastle Knights and Penrith Panthers in the NRL. Gordon was recognised in 1990 as the best wing of the year winning the Dally M Winger Of The Year.

Gordon is the second cousin of Cronulla-Sutherland Sharks winger Isaac Gordon.

Background
Gordon was born in Brewarrina, New South Wales.  Gordon played junior rugby league at Cardiff, before moving to Souths Newcastle.

Playing career
Gordon played for the Newcastle Knights for most of his career doing them proud. Gordon then played for the Penrith Panthers for a year and came back to the Knights for a farewell year.

References

1969 births
Living people
Australian rugby league players
Country New South Wales Origin rugby league team players
Indigenous Australian rugby league players
Newcastle Knights players
Penrith Panthers players
Rugby league fullbacks
Rugby league players from New South Wales
Rugby league wingers